Afrotheora is a genus of moths of the family Hepialidae. There are 7 described species, all found in southern Africa. They are considered to be one of the more primitive genera of the Hepialidae, with short antennae and lacking a functional proboscis.

Species 
Afrotheora argentimaculata – South Africa
Afrotheora brevivalva – Tanzania
Afrotheora flavimaculata – Angola
Afrotheora jordani – Angola
Afrotheora minirhodaula – South Africa
Afrotheora rhodaula – South Africa
Afrotheora thermodes – South Africa

External links
Hepialidae genera

Hepialidae
Exoporia genera
Taxa named by Ebbe Nielsen